El Mirage (corruption of El Miraje, Spanish for "The Mirage") is an unincorporated community in the western Victor Valley of the Mojave Desert, within San Bernardino County, California.

Climate
El Mirage has a hot desert climate (BS) typical of Southern California's interior with hot, dry summers and cool winters.

Education
El Mirage School, a K-8 Campus, is operated by neighboring Adelanto Elementary School District.  Students in the upper grades attend High School in Victor Valley Union High School District, including Adelanto High School.

Filmings
The music video for the song "Dilly" by Band of Horses was filmed in 2010 at Murphy's Bar and Grill, now permanently closed. Billy Currington filmed his music video "I got a feelin'"in 2004 starring Gena Lee Nolin.

See also

Mirage Airfield
Grey Butte Auxiliary Airfield

References

Unincorporated communities in San Bernardino County, California
Populated places in the Mojave Desert
Victor Valley
Unincorporated communities in California